Uno is a 2005 Filipino action thriller film directed by Ronnie Ricketts (as Ronn-Rick) and co-written by Ricketts, Lito N. Mena and Ricardo Cepeda. About an assassin intending to retire who finds himself the target of another assassin, it stars Ricketts and Monsour del Rosario alongside Danica Sotto, Cheska Garcia, Dinky Doo, Erica Fuente, Boy Roque, T.J. Trinidad and Cepeda. Produced by Ricketts' production company Rocketts Productions, it was given a limited theatrical release on January 19, 2005. The film is noted for being one of the few action films produced by the Philippine film industry in the mid-to-late 2000s.

Cast

Ronnie Ricketts as Niko
Monsour del Rosario as Mike
Mark Gil
Ricardo Cepeda
Dinky Doo
Danica Sotto
Chesca Garcia
T.J. Trinidad
Erica Fuente
Ella Marie
Mike Gayoso
John Apacible
Bruce Ricketts
Mila Ocampo
Jeffrey Santos
Edgar Mande
Marie Ricketts
Jessa Marie
Boy Roque
Topher Ricketts
Vic Felipe
Dr. Rimando Saguin
Rey Bejar
Jay Yulo
Dong Serrano
Rodel Bansil
Jonathan Gabriel
Dante Javier

Production
Actor Monsour del Rosario stated that the film's story is inspired by the 1995 film Assassins starring Sylvester Stallone and Antonio Banderas.

Ronnie Ricketts' six-year-old daughter Marie insisted on being part of the cast of Uno as she aspired to become an actress, to which he accepted.

Release
Uno was released in SM Supermalls theaters on January 19, 2005. Playwright Nestor U. Torre, writing for the Philippine Daily Inquirer, noted how the film was released during a period when action films in the country largely ceased being produced by film studios due to the local film industry undergoing a financial slump in the 2000s.

References

External links

2005 films
2005 action films
2005 action thriller films
Filipino-language films
Philippine action films